Sibsey was a railway station on the East Lincolnshire Railway which served the village of Sibsey in Lincolnshire between 1848 and 1964. Withdrawal of passenger services took place in 1961, followed by goods facilities in 1964. The line through the station remains in use as part of the Poacher Line between Boston and Skegness.

History
The station was opened on 2 October 1848. This section was the last to be completed in September 1848 at an agreed cost of  £123,000. The village of Sibsey lay to the north-west of the line; at the time, it was a small settlement on the Horncastle Road. A four-road goods yard facing Boston was provided and this was extended by the mid-1920s to seven roads, later eight. The Great Northern Railway acquired extra land around the station to facilitate the expansion, which was necessary to cope with the increasing potato and sugar beet traffic. 

During the interwar period, Sibsey dealt with up to 80 wagons of potatoes or beet a day. They were brought to Sibsey to be marshalled with existing wagons before being despatched to Boston at 4.45pm. At the time, five up and down passenger services, and one Sunday service each way, called at Sibsey. The station was closed to passengers on 11 September 1961 and to goods traffic on 15 June 1964.

Present day
Sibsey Station house was sold in 1964 and partly converted to a private house, and remained in the same hands until 2017 when it was sold again, and completely renovated. The goods office remains largely untouched. The platforms have been demolished.

References

Sources

 

 

Disused railway stations in Lincolnshire
Railway stations in Great Britain closed in 1961
Railway stations in Great Britain opened in 1848
Former Great Northern Railway stations